Sir Edward Penton (18 June 1875 – 21 December 1967) was a British Clothing administrator and Liberal Party politician who was Mayor of St Marylebone.

Background
Penton was born the eldest son of Edward Penton. He was educated at Rugby School and New College, Oxford, where he received an Honours History School, BA in 1897. In 1902 he married Eleanor Sharpe. They had four sons and three daughters. He was knighted in 1918.

Professional career
Penton was Superintendent of the Royal Army Clothing Department (Boot Section) from 1914–19. He was Chief Inspector of Clothing for the Central Ordnance Depot at Branston, Burton-on-Trent, until 30 June 1946. He then acted as Secretary to the Commonwealth Conference on design, development and inspection of Stores and clothing.

Political career
Penton was elected to the council of the Metropolitan Borough of St Marylebone. From 1912-1913 he served as the Mayor of Marylebone. In 1913 he became an Alderman of the council. He was Liberal candidate for the Tiverton division of Devon at the 1918 general election. His Unionist opponent was endorsed by the Coalition Government, and Penton came second. He was Liberal candidate for the Lewisham East division at the 1923 and 1929 general elections. On both occasions he came third. He did not stand for parliament again.

Electoral record

References

1875 births
1967 deaths
Liberal Party (UK) parliamentary candidates
People educated at Rugby School
Alumni of New College, Oxford